Guzmania garciaensis is a plant species in the genus Guzmania. This species is native to Ecuador and Peru.

References

garciaensis
Flora of Ecuador
Flora of Peru
Plants described in 1979